"Sä huudat" is a song by Finnish rapper Cheek released as the first single from his ninth studio album Alpha Omega. The song peaked at number one on the Finnish Singles Chart.

Charts

References

2015 songs
2015 singles
Cheek (rapper) songs
Finnish-language songs
Warner Music Group singles